Anacyptus is a genus of rove beetles in the family Staphylinidae. There is one described species in Anacyptus, A. testaceus.

References

Further reading

 
 
 

Aleocharinae
Articles created by Qbugbot